The Wild Places may refer to:
 The Wild Places (book), a 2007 book by Robert Macfarlane
 The Wild Places (Dan Fogelberg album)
 The Wild Places (Duncan Browne album)